Painesdale is an unincorporated community in Houghton County, Michigan, United States. Painesdale has a post office with ZIP code 49955.

History
Painesdale was built by the Champion Mining Company between 1899 and 1917, and named after the Boston businessman William A. Paine, who was associated with many mines as well as the Paine Webber brokerage.  Painesdale was located near the copper load, and the company designed the town following theories of efficient planning.

In 1993, the town was added to the National Register of Historic Places.  The designation applies to the area encompassing Painesdale streets and the Champion Mine.

Description

Painesdale contains rows of identical saltbox workers' houses as well as managers' houses that were more individualized. A single shaft house from the Champion Mine is still in the lower part of town, surrounded by other substantial mine buildings.

Demographics

See also
Seeberville Murders

References

Census-designated places in Michigan
Census-designated places in Houghton County, Michigan
Unincorporated communities in Houghton County, Michigan
Unincorporated communities in Michigan
1899 establishments in Michigan
Populated places established in 1899
Houghton micropolitan area, Michigan
Permanent System radar stations